St Saviour's Church is an Anglican parish church to the north of the hamlet of Aughton, Lancashire, England.

Ecclesiastical organisation
The church is within the deanery of Tunstall, the archdeaconry of Lancaster and the diocese of Blackburn. Its benefice is united with those of St Wilfrid, Halton and St Luke, Slyne-with-Hest.

History

The church was built in 1864 and designed by the Lancaster architect E. G. Paley. It cost £590 (equivalent of £ in ), and provided seating for 100 people.  In 1913–14 the successors in the Lancaster practice, Austin and Paley added a parclose screen.

Architecture

It is a small church with lancet windows, including a triple lancet at the east end. It has a bellcote at the west end, and a south porch.

See also

 List of ecclesiastical works by E. G. Paley
 List of ecclesiastical works by Austin and Paley (1895–1914)

References

Bibliography

 

Church of England church buildings in Lancashire
Gothic Revival church buildings in England
Gothic Revival architecture in Lancashire
Churches completed in 1864
19th-century Church of England church buildings
Church buildings by E. G. Paley
Churches in the City of Lancaster